This is a list of food podcasts, Podcasting, and food-related podcasts. They are listed by release date of the first episode. A few details are added for some podcasts that don't have their own article.

List

1997
 The Splendid Table (originally premiered as a radio show in 1997, later moved to podcast format)

2005
 Food for Thought

2010
 The Sporkful
 Spilled Milk

2012
 I'll Drink to That

2014
 Bon Appétit Foodcast
 Gastropod
 Radio Cherry Bombe

2015
 Doughboys (May 20, 2015)

2016
 The Racist Sandwich (May 2016)
 The Four Top (September 2016)
 Your Last Meal

2017
 Toasted Sister (January 5, 2017)
 Starving For Attention

2018
 Proof 
Hoovering (January 20, 2018) 
Off Menu with Ed Gamble and James Acaster (December 2018)

2019
 Food 360 (June 6, 2019)

2020
 Food Court with Richard Blais
 A Hot Dog Is A Sandwich

References 

Infotainment

Lists of podcasts